Luodao (罗道 "Way of Luo") or Luoism (罗教), originally Wuweiism (无为教), refers to a Chinese folk religious tradition, a wide range of sect organisations flourishing over the last five hundred years, which trace their origins back to the mystic and preacher Luo Menghong (1443–1527), the Patriarch Luo (罗祖 Luōzǔ) and the revelation contained in his major scripture, the Wǔbùliùcè (五部六册 "Five Instructions in Six Books"), which official title is The Scroll of Apprehending the Way through Hard Work and that marked the beginning of the precious scrolls' tradition.

Luo and the movement he started is considered the most important influence within the Chinese salvationist tradition. A wide range of religious groups can be traced to Luo's teachings, their names are numerous and have changed over the centuries. Some of them have remained close to original Wuweiism as transmitted in Luo's scriptures, while other ones have developed other beliefs only preserving the name of the founding master.

Types of Luodao, together with other folk religions, have revived rapidly in China since the 1980s, and if conceptualised as a single group today they are said to have more followers than the five state-sanctioned religions counted together.

History

Luo Menghong was born in 1442 in the area of Jimo, in Shandong province. His religious titles were Luo Qing (Luo the Clear), Luo Jing (Luo the Quiet) and the Inactive Hermit (无为隐士 Wúwéi Yǐnshì). He died at the age of eighty-five in 1527. The religious group he founded was called "Wuweiism", a name that has been continued by the purest branches of the movement in later history.

Early direct transmissions
As long as Patriarch Luo was alive, his personality guaranteed the unity of the movement. While some of his disciples may have established separate communities, they didn't contest Luo's position as teacher and leader of Wuweiism. Then, when Luo died, apparently without having chosen a successor to the leadership, the Wuwei teaching started to split into different branches all claiming to continue Luo's tradition.

Little more than half a century after the death of Luo, the activities of Luoist sects began to raise the suspicion of state officials. Just after 1584 several warnings were presented to the throne, against the influence of Luoism linking it to the earlier White Lotus movement, a label which by that time had become a derogatory designation used by official historians to demonise religious groups considered heretical by the established orthodoxy. At the end of the 16th century there were religious groups which influenced and in turn were influenced by the Luoists, Hongyangism (弘阳教 "Red [or Great] Sun") and the Huangtiandao ("Way of the Yellow Sky"), both identifying as Taoist branches.

Documents produced by the Buddhist establishment condemning Luoists testify the activity in the late 16th century of the branches known as Great Vehicles (大乘 Dacheng) and Timeless (无年 Wunian) Luoism. The sources show that at the end of the 16th century, Luoist sects had spread widely in northern China, and they were known by different names.

Luo family transmission
Also the Luo family contributed to the transmission of Luo's teaching. Within the original movement, Luo's wife and two children, Fozheng and Foguang, occupied relevant positions. Successively, Luo's wife continued the teaching according to the original tradition. She founded a branch named Sudden Stillness (圆頓 Yuandun) which by the late Ming dynasty no longer claimed connection to Luo's wife.

Fozheng continued the male line of the Luo family. His grandson Wenju is mentioned in the imprint of the 1615 edition of the Wubuliuce, printed in Nanjing. Luo Congshan, the fourth generation patriarch, lived at the beginning of the 17th century. A century later, official records testify that there were still male descendants of Luo active as sect leaders. The centre of the family was in Miyun, where the tomb of Luo Menghong still existed. It was destroyed on official order in 1768.

Grand Canal transmission
In the early 18th century Luoist sects spread along the Grand Canal from Hebei to Zhejiang and Fujian; boatmen belonging to Luoist sects recognised the eighth generation descendant Luo Mingzhong as the head of the religion. Records of the late 18th century testify the contribution of three persons surnamed Qiang, Wen and Pan, to the diffusion of the religion in southeast China. They founded three different lines, which congregation halls (an) also functioned as social relief institutions. After the ninth patriarch the line of hereditary leadership came to an end. An investigation of 1816 testifies that the male descendants of Luo no longer practiced the religion of the forefather.

Yin Ji'nan and Yaoism

Meanwhile, in the 16th century Yin Ji'nan (1527-1582) from Zhejiang originated an independent line that successfully spread throughout their native province, Fujian, Jiangxi and surrounding southern provinces. He became the leader of a Luoist group and reformed it into the Venerable Officials' teaching of fasting (老官斋教 Lǎoguān zhāijiào), which in later centuries gave rise to the Xiantiandao.

Yin Ji'nan organised his movement into a hierarchy and integrated the theology about Maitreya, the Wusheng Laomu and the Three Suns eschatology within the original Luoist doctrines through the influence of a Hunyuan sect. Years after Yin's death, Yao Wenyu (1578-1646) rose as the leader of the religion with strong opposition from other influential members, although he greatly expanded the sect's empire. By the time of Yao's successors in the late 17th century the sect was known as the Numinous Mountain (灵山 Lingshan).

Yaoism later gave rise to the Dragon Flower (龙花 Longhua) sect and other branches. Wu Zixiang's branch, the Great Vehicle (Dacheng) or Third Vehicle (三乘 Sancheng) introduced his scripture entitled the "Book of the Great Precepts of the Great Vehicle" (Dacheng dajie jing).

Zhenkongdao and other branches
Another important indirect branching is that started by Sun Zhenkong, claiming to be the fourth patriarch after Qin Dongshan and Master Zhao, a disciple of Luo who founded and independent group called Wujidao (无极道 "Way of the Unlimited"). Patriarch Sun incorporated the theology of Maitreya and Wusheng Laomu just half a century after the death of Luo and called his group the Namodao (南無道). The Namodao later developed into different currents. A disciple of Yi Ji'nan's school, Pushen, formulated a Chan interpretation of Luo's writings that excluded the Maitreya eschatology.

Zhenkongdao (真空道 "Way of the True Void") founded in Anhui in the 1860s, is another Luoist branch promoting sitting meditation, healing, and scriptures recitation. The group expanded to Fujian in the late 19th century, and from there throughout southern China and Southeast Asian Chinese ethnic groups. It is possibly a continuation of Patriarch Sun's branch.

Luo Menghong's life and mysticism
An orphan since youth, Luo Qing was raised by relatives and became a soldier. At the age of twenty-eight, for his distressful sentiment of forlornness, he went on a spiritual quest and studied with several teachers, although he was unable to establish permanent relationships. Only at the age of forty, apparently without a direct guidance of a teacher, he reached enlightenment: awareness to be united with the absolute principle of reality. He began gathering disciples and wrote the Wubuliuce ("Five Instructions in Six Books"), first printed in 1527.

Written in a lucid vernacular language, Luo's texts are characterised by an egalitarian tone, erasing differences between lay and clergy, upper and lower classes, and men and women. Drawing on his own experience as an orphan, Luo describes the human condition of being lost and in search of one's true home and refuge. He speaks of the final destination that is the absolute principle of being, variously representing it through abstract symbols. An experience similar to that of Luo can be found in the biography of Lin Zhao'en, the founder of the Sanyi teaching.

By the 17th century the teachings of Luo combined with other folk beliefs, namely Maitreyan millenarianism and the folk mother goddess. In the new mythological representation of Luo's enlightenment, humans are children of the primordial goddess. Confused by the desires of the material world, they have forgotten their celestial origin, and so the Mother sends emissaries to remind her children the possibility of return to the original condition in the Three Suns, or stages of the world. The three enlightened beings are Dipankara, Gautama and Maitreya the future one.

Doctrine

God and the Goddess

In the theology of Luoist sects the absolute principle of the universe is the central focus of meaning and worship. In the original writings of Luo it is represented as "True Void" (真空 Zhēnkōng). Since the 17th century the prevalent representation became a goddess, the Unborn Venerable Mother (無生老母 Wúshēng Lǎomǔ). Other symbols of the source of being, also common to other traditions, are Wújí (the "Unlimited"), Zhēn (真 "Truth", "True Reality"), Gǔfú (古佛 "Ancient Awakened").

These symbols are commonly combined in sect's precious scrolls to express the impersonal absolute origin according to the tastes of different social groups. The absolute principle is also associated to the Big Dipper asterism.

Luo Menghong's original revelation emphasises the impersonal representation of the absolute. However, he also talks of Holy Patriarch of the Unlimited (无极圣祖 Wújí Shèngzǔ) and of the mother as a duality, the Eternal Parents (無生父母 Wúshēng Fùmǔ). Patriarch Luo is considered an incarnation of the universal God by his followers.

Eschatology

The Three Suns (三阳 sānyáng) eschatological doctrine places itself in a tradition flourishing at least since the Ming dynasty. It can be traced back to a Hunyuan Taoist school named after the concept of hunyuan ("original undetermined") that existed before hundun ("coalesced undetermined") and is the beginning of primordial qi (yuanqi) according to some Taoist cosmologies. Although originally Taoist, these concepts became part of the folk tradition and were incorporated into the sects.

In the earliest sects of the Ming period, the Lord of the Original Chaos (混元主 Hùnyuánzhǔ) represents the origin of the universe developing through three stages, yang, or cosmic periods. In most sect scriptures, these three periods are known as Green Sun (qingyang), Red Sun (hongyang) and White Sun (baiyang). They are known by other names due to oral transmission of the teaching.

The earliest written evidence of this doctrine can be found in the Huangji jieguo baojuan, published in 1430. In this text the three stages are already associated to the three buddhas Dipankara, Gautama and Maitreya.

Practice and salvation
In Luoist writings the symbol of wúshēng (無生 "unborn") means the state of "no birth and no death" that gives enlightenment. The Unborn Venerable Mother or the Holy Patriarch of the Unlimited are personifications of this state. In Luoist traditions, as written for example in the "Book of the Dragon Flower" (Longhuajing), meditation has a crucial role in the path to salvation, that corresponds to the "return to the mother" or the wusheng state. Salvation is the realisation of one's true nature.

See also
 Chinese religions of fasting
 Chinese salvationist religions
 Dacheng teaching of Mount Jizu
 Maitreya teachings
 Xiantiandao
 Sanyi teaching

Footnotes

References

Sources
 Hubert Michael Seiwert. Popular Religious Movements and Heterodox Sects in Chinese History. Brill, 2003. 
 Xisha Ma, Huiying Meng. Popular Religion and Shamanism. BRILL, 2011. 
 Randall L. Nadeau. The Wiley-Blackwell Companion to Chinese Religions. John Wiley & Sons, 2012.
 Vincent Goossaert, David Palmer. The Religious Question in Modern China. University of Chicago Press, 2011. 
 Xisha Ma, Huiying Meng. Popular Religion and Shamanism. Brill, 2011.

External links
 Five Instructions in Six Books 
 Zhenkong way—Zhenkong religion 

Chinese salvationist religions
Heresy in Buddhism